The 2019 Southland Conference women's basketball tournament, a part of the 2018–19 NCAA Division I women's basketball season, took place March 14–17, 2019 at the Merrell Center in Katy, Texas. The winner of the tournament, Abilene Christian received the Southland Conference's automatic bid to the 2019 NCAA tournament.  Breanna Wright was named the tournament's Most Valuable Player.

Seeds and regular season standings
Only the Top 8 teams advanced to the Southland Conference tournament. This chart shows all the teams records and standings and explains why teams advanced to the conference tourney or finished in certain tiebreaking positions.

Schedule
Source:

Bracket

Awards and honors
Source: 
Tournament MVP: Breanna Wright (Abilene Christian)
All-Tournament Team:

 Breanna Wright (Abilene Christian)
 Sara Williamson (Abilene Christian)
 Alexes Bryant (Texas A&M–Corpus Christi)
 Dalesia Booth (Texas A&M–Corpus Christi)
 Moe Kinard (Lamar)

See also
2019 Southland Conference men's basketball tournament
Southland Conference women's basketball tournament

References

External links
 2019 Southland Conference Basketball Tournament

Southland Conference women's basketball tournament
2018–19 Southland Conference women's basketball season
Southland Conference Women's basketball